Rhamnogalacturonan rhamnohydrolase (RG-rhamnohydrolase, RG alpha-L-rhamnopyranohydrolase) is an enzyme with systematic name rhamnogalacturonan oligosaccharide alpha-L-Rha-(1->4)-alpha-D-GalA rhamnohydrolase. This enzyme catalyses the following chemical reaction

 Exohydrolysis of the alpha-L-Rha-(1->4)-alpha-D-GalA bond in rhamnogalacturonan oligosaccharides with initial inversion of configuration releasing beta-L-rhamnose from the non-reducing end of rhamnogalacturonan oligosaccharides.

The enzyme is part of the degradation system for rhamnogalacturonan I in Aspergillus aculeatus.

References

External links 
 

EC 3.2.1